Ioannis Roufos (1870-1908) was a Greek politician.

He was the son of Georgios Rouphos, a politician and the 11th Mayor of Patras and a grandson of Benizelos Roufos, a Prime Minister of Greece and Mayor of Patras, he is descended from the Rouphos-Kanakaris families with many generations of politicians and descended from southern Italy.

He was a politician of Achaea in 1899, he died early in 1908.  The newspaper Neologos wrote on his death in which the Public Council in it did not receive voting condolescences.

References
The first version of the article is translated and is based from the article at the Greek Wikipedia (el:Main Page)

1908 deaths
Politicians from Patras
1870 births